The following is a complete list of the compositions by the French composer Gabriel Fauré. Works are listed both by genre and by opus number.

By genre

Piano

Solo Piano
Fugue à trois parties in F major (c1862)
Sonata in F major (1863)
Trois romances sans paroles, Op. 17 (?1863)
Mazurka in B (c1865)
Gavotte in C minor (1869)
Huit pièces brèves, Op. 84 (1869-1902)
Mazurka in B major, Op. 32 (c1875)
Nocturne no.1 in E minor, Op. 33/1 (c1875)
Ballade in F major, Op. 19 (1877-9)
Impromptu no.1 in E major, Op. 25 (1881)
Barcarolle no.1 in A minor, Op. 26 (?1881)
Nocturne no.2 in B major, Op. 33/2 (c1881)
Valse-caprice no.1 in A major, Op. 30 (1882)
Impromptu no.2 in F minor, Op. 31 (1883)
Nocturne no.3 in A major, Op. 33/3 (1883)
Impromptu no.3 in A major, Op. 34 (1883)
Valse-caprice no.2 in D major, Op. 38 (1884)
Nocturne no.4 in E major, Op. 36 (1884)
Nocturne no.5 in B major, Op. 37 (1884)
Barcarolle no.2 in G major, Op. 41 (1885)
Barcarolle no.3 in G major, Op. 42 (1885)
Barcarolle no.4 in A major, Op. 44 (1886)
Valse-caprice no.3 in G major, Op. 59 (1887-93)
Valse-caprice no.4 in A major, Op. 62 (1893-4)
Nocturne no.6 in D major, Op. 63 (1894)
Barcarolle no.5 in F minor, Op. 66 (1894)
Theme and variations in C minor, Op. 73 (1895)
Barcarolle no.6 in E major, Op. 70 (?1895)
Prelude in C major (1897)
Nocturne no.7 in C minor, Op. 74 (1898)
Nocturne no.8 in D major, Op. 84/8 (1902)
Barcarolle no.7 in D minor, Op. 90 (1905)
Impromptu no.4 in D major, Op. 91 (1905-6)
Barcarolle no.8 in D major, Op. 96 (1906)
Nocturne no.9 in B minor, Op. 97 (?1908)
Nocturne no.10 in E minor, Op. 99 (1908)
Barcarolle no.9 in A minor, Op. 101 (1908-9)
Impromptu no.5 in F minor, Op. 102 (1908-9)
Nine Preludes, Op. 103 (1909-10)
Nocturne no.11 in F minor, Op. 104/1 (1913)
Barcarolle no.10 in A minor, Op. 104/2 (1913)
Barcarolle no.11 in G minor, Op. 105 (1913)
Barcarolle no.12 in E minor, Op. 106bis (1915)
Nocturne no.12 in E minor, Op. 107 (1915)
Barcarolle no.13 in C major, Op. 116 (1921)
Nocturne no.13 in B minor, Op. 119 (1921)

Piano four hands
Souvenirs de Bayreuth (1888)
Allegro symphonique, Op. 68 (1895)
Dolly, Op. 56 (1894-6)

Chamber music

Violin and piano
Violin Sonata No. 1 in A major, Op. 13 (1875-6)
Berceuse, Op. 16 (1879)
Romance in B major, Op. 28 (1883)
Andante, Op. 75 (1898)
Morceau de lecture (1903)
Violin Sonata No. 2 in E minor, Op. 108 (1916-7)

Cello and piano 
Élégie, Op. 24  (1880)
Papillon, Op. 77 (1885)
Romance, Op. 69 (1894)
Sicilienne, Op. 78 (1898)
Sérénade, Op. 98 (1908)
Cello Sonata No. 1 in D minor, Op. 109 (1917)
Cello Sonata No. 2 in G minor, Op. 117 (1921)

Flute and piano
 Fantaisie, Op. 79 (1898)
 Morceau de concours (1898)

String ensemble and piano
Piano Quartet No. 1 in C minor, Op. 15 (1876-9)
Piano Quartet No. 2 in G minor, Op. 45 (1887)
Piano Quintet No. 1 in D minor, Op. 89 (1887-95)
Piano Quintet No. 2 in C minor, Op. 115 (1919-21)
Piano Trio in D minor, Op. 120 (1922-3)

Strings
Morceau de lecture for two cellos (1897)
String Quartet in E minor, Op. 121 (1924)

Solo harp
Impromptu, Op. 86 (1904)
Morceau de lecture (1904)
Une châtelaine en sa tour, Op. 110 (1918)

Voice and piano

Choral

Religious
Super flumina Babylonis (1863)
Cantique de Jean Racine, Op. 11 (1865)
Cantique à St Vincent de Paul, lost (1868)
Ave Maria, Op. posth (1871)
Cantique pour la Fête d’un supérieur, lost (c1872)
Tu es Petrus (c. 1872)
Benedictus (c. 1880) (first edition 1999)
Messe basse (1882, rev. 1906)
O salutaris, Op. 47/1 (1888)
Maria Mater gratiae, Op. 47/2 (1888)
Requiem, Op. 48 (1877, 1887–93)
Ecce fidelis servus, Op. 54 (1889)
Tantum ergo in A major, Op. 55 (?1890)
Ave verum corpus, Op. 65/1 (1894)
Tantum ergo in E major, Op. 65/2 (1894)
Sancta mater (1894)
Ave Maria in F major (?1894)
Salve Regina, Op. 67/1 (1895)
Ave Maria in A major, Op. 67/2 (1895)
Tantum ergo in F major (1904)
Ave Maria in B minor, Op. 93 (1906)

In collaboration with André Messager:
Messe des pêcheurs de Villerville

Secular
Les djinns, Op. 12 (?1875)
Le ruisseau, Op. 22 (?1881)
La naissance de Vénus, Op. 29, libretto by Paul Collin (1882)
Madrigal, Op. 35 (1883)
l est né le divin enfant (1888)
Noël d’enfants (Les anges dans nos campagnes) (c1890)
Hymne à Apollon, Op. 63bis (1894, rev. 1914)
Pleurs d’or, Op. 72 (1896)

Orchestral
 Symphonic Suite, Op. 20 in F major (1865-74)
 Violin Concerto in D minor, Op. 14 (unfinished) (1878-9)
 Ballade for piano and orchestra in F major, Op. 19 (arr. of original version for piano solo) (1881)
 Symphony in D minor, Op. 40 (destroyed, material re-used in Op. 108 and Op. 109) (1884)
 Pavane, Op. 50 (1887)
 Caligula, Op. 52 (1888)
 Shylock, Op. 57 (1890)
 Pelléas et Mélisande, Op. 80 (1900)
 Le voile du bonheur, Op. 88
 Fantaisie for piano and orchestra, Op. 111 (1918)
 Masques et bergamasques, Op. 112 (1919)

Operas
Prométhée, Op. 82 (Opera in three acts: Tragédie lyrique, fp. 1900)
Pénélope (Opera in three acts: Poème lyrique, fp. 1913)

By opus number
 Op. 1 Two Songs
Le papillon et la fleur
Mai
 Op. 2 Two Songs
Dans le ruines d'une abbaye
Les matelots
 Op. 3 Two Songs
Seule
Sérénade toscane
 Op. 4 Two Songs
Chanson du pêcheur (lamento)
Lydia
 Op. 5 Three Songs
Chant d'automne
Rêve d'amour
L'absent
 Op. 6 Three Songs
Aubade
Tristesse
Sylvie
 Op. 7 Three Songs (1870-8)
Après un rêve
Hymne
Barcarolle
 Op. 8 Three Songs
Au bord de l'eau
La rançon
Ici-bas
 Op. 9 Number was not allocated to a composition.
 Op. 10 Two Duets
Puisqu'ici-bas
Tarantelle
 Op. 11 Cantique de Jean Racine (1865)
 Op. 12 Les djinns (1875?), for mixed chorus and piano or orchestra, after Hugo
 Op. 13 Violin Sonata No. 1 in A major (1875-6)
 Op. 14 Violin Concerto (1878-9), unfinished
 Op. 15 Piano Quartet No. 1 in C minor (1876-9)
 Op. 16 Berceuse for piano and violin (1878-9), also for violin/cello and orchestra
 Op. 17 Romances sans paroles (1863)
 No. 1 Andante quasi allegretto
 No. 2 Allegro molto
 No. 3 Andante moderato
 Op. 18 Three Songs (1878)
Nell
Le voyageur
Automne
 Op. 19 Ballade (1881), originally for piano solo, orchestral accompaniment later added
 Op. 20 Symphonic Suite in F  (1865–74)
 Op. 21 Poème d'un jour, song cycle
Rencontre
Toujours
Adieu
 Op. 22 Le ruisseau, (1881?) for 2-part female chorus and piano
 Op. 23 Three Songs (1879)
Les berceaux
Notre amour
Le secret
 Op. 24 Élégie for cello and piano (1883), orchestrated 1890
 Op. 25 Impromptu No. 1 in E-flat (1881)
 Op. 26 Barcarolle No. 1 in A minor (1881)
 Op. 27 2 Mélodies (1882)
Chanson d'amour
La fée aux chansons
 Op. 28 Romance for violin and piano (1877)
 Op. 29 La naissance de Vénus (1882)
 Op. 30 Valse-Caprice No. 1 in A (1882)
 Op. 31 Impromptu No. 2 in F minor (1883)
 Op. 32 Mazurka in B-flat (1875)
 Op. 33 Three Nocturnes
No. 1 in E-flat minor (1875)
No. 2 in B (1881)
No. 3 in A-flat (1883)
 Op. 34 Impromptu No. 3 in A-flat (1883)
 Op. 35 Madrigal
 Op. 36 Nocturne No. 4 in E-flat (1884)
 Op. 37 Nocturne No. 5 in B-flat (1884)
 Op. 38 Valse-Caprice No. 2 in D-flat (1884)
 Op. 39 Four Songs (1884)
Aurore
Fleur jetée
Le pays des rêves
Les roses d'Ispahan
 Op. 40 Symphony in D minor (1884)
 Op. 41 Barcarolle No. 2 in G (1885)
 Op. 42 Barcarolle No. 3 in G-flat (1885)
 Op. 43 Two Songs (1885-6)
Noël
Nocturne
 Op. 44 Barcarolle No. 4 in A-flat (1886)
 Op. 45 Piano Quartet No. 2 in G minor (1885-6)
 Op. 46 Two Songs (1887)
Les présents
Clair de lune
 Op. 47 No. 1 O Salutaris (1887)
 Op. 47 No. 2 Maria, Mater Gratiae (1887)
 Op. 48 Requiem in D minor (1877, rev. 1887–90, orch. 1899)
 Op. 49 Petite Pièce in G for cello and piano (c. 1888) now lost
 Op. 50 Pavane in F-sharp minor (1887)
 Op. 51 Four Songs (1888)
Larmes
Au cimetière
Spleen
La rose
 Op. 52 Caligula (1888)
 Op. 53  Number was not allocated to a composition.
 Op. 54 Ecce fidelis servus (1890), motet
 Op. 55 Tantum ergo (1890)
 Op. 56 Dolly Suite for piano four hands (1894-7), orch. Rabaud 1906
 Berceuse (1894)
 Mi-a-ou (1896)
 Le jardin de Dolly (1896)
 Kitty-valse (1896)
 Tendresse (1896)
 Le pas espagnol (1897)
 Op. 57 Shylock Suite (1889)
 Op. 58 Cinq mélodies "de Venise" (1891), song cycle after Verlaine
Mandoline
En sourdine
Green
À Clymène
C'est l'extase
 Op. 59 Valse-Caprice No. 3 in G-flat (1887–93)
 Op. 60 Number was not allocated to a composition. However, "Opus 60" was used to refer to an early version of the piano quintet Op. 89. 
 Op. 61 La Bonne Chanson (1892–4), song cycle after Verlaine
Une sainte en son auréole
Puisque l'aube grandit
La lune blanche luit dans les bois
J'allais par des chemins perfides
J'ai presque peur, en vérité
Avant que tu ne t'en ailles
Donc, ce sera par un clair jour d'été
N'est-ce pas?
L'hiver a cessé
 Op. 62 Valse-Caprice No. 4 in A-flat (1893-4)
 Op. 63 Nocturne No. 6 in D-flat (1894)
 Op. 63bis Hymne à Apollon (1894)
 Op. 64 Number was not allocated to a composition.
 Op. 65 No. 1 Ave verum corpus (1894)
 Op. 65 No. 2 Tantum ergo (1894)
 Op. 66 Barcarolle No. 5 in F-sharp minor (1894)
 Op. 67 No. 1 Salve Regina (1894-5)
 Op. 67 No. 2 Ave Maria (1894-5)
 Op. 68 Allegro symphonique (1895), arr. for piano 4 hands from 1st movement of Symphonic Suite, Op. 20
 Op. 69 Romance in A for cello and piano (1894)
 Op. 70 Barcarolle No. 6 in E-flat (1895)
 Op. 72 Pleurs d’or
 Op. 73 Theme and Variations for piano (1895), orch. Inghelbrecht 1955
 Theme
 Variation I L'istesso tempo
 Variation II Piu mosso
 Variation III Un poco piu mosso
 Variation IV L'istesso tempo
 Variation V Un poco piu mosso
 Variation VI Molto adagio
 Variation VII Allegro moderato
 Variation VIII Andante molto moderato
 Variation IX Quasi adagio
 Variation X Allegro vivo
 Variation XI Andante molto, moderato espressivo
 Op. 74 Nocturne No. 7 in C-sharp minor (1898)
 Op. 75 Andante for violin and piano (1897)
 Op. 76 Two Songs (1897)
Le parfum impérissable
Arpège
 Op. 77 Papillon for cello and piano (1884), also for string quintet or violin and piano
 Op. 78 Sicilienne for cello and piano, (1898)
 Op. 79 Fantaisie for flute and piano, (1898), orch. Aubuert (1957)
 Op. 80 Pelléas et Mélisande (1898)
 Op. 82 Prométhée (1900)
 Op. 83 Two Songs (1894)
Prison
Soir
 Op. 84 Huit pièces brèves (1869–1902)
 No. 1 Capriccio in E-flat major
 No. 2 Fantaisie in A-flat major
 No. 3 Fugue in A minor
 No. 4 Adagietto in E minor
 No. 5 Improvisation in C-sharp minor
 No. 6 Fugue in E minor
 No. 7 Allegresse in C major
 No. 8 Nocturne No. 8 in D-flat major (1898–1902)
 Op. 85 Trois mélodies (1902)
Dans la forêt de septembre
La fleur qui va sur l'eau
Accompagnement
 Op. 86 Impromptu for harp (1904) (piano arrangement is Op.86 bis, 'Impromptu No. 6' in D-flat)
 Op. 87 Two Songs (1904)
Le Plus doux chemin
Le ramier
 Op. 88 Le voile du bonheur (1901), after Clemenceau
 Op. 89 Piano Quintet No. 1 in D minor (1890-4, rev. 1903–5)
 Op. 90 Barcarolle No. 7 in D minor (1905)
 Op. 91 Impromptu No. 4 in D-flat (1905)
 Op. 92 Le don silencieux (1906)
 Op. 93 Ave Maria for two sopranos and organ (1906)
 Op. 94 Chanson (1906)
 Op. 95 La chanson d'Ève (1906–10), song cycle after van Lerberghe
Paradis
Prima verba
Roses ardentes
Comme Dieu rayonne
L'aube blanche
Eau vivante
Veilles-tu, ma senteur de soleil?
Dans un parfum de roses blanches
Crépuscule
O mort, poussière d'étoiles
 Op. 96 Barcarolle No. 8 in D-flat (1906)
 Op. 97 Nocturne No. 9 in B minor (1908)
 Op. 98 Sérénade for cello and piano (1908)
 Op. 99 Nocturne No. 10 in E minor (1908)
 Op. 100 Number was not allocated to a composition.
 Op. 101 Barcarolle No. 9 in A minor (1908-9)
 Op. 102 Impromptu No. 5 in F-sharp minor (1909)
 Op. 103 Nine Préludes (1909–10)
 No. 1 in D-flat major
 No. 2 in C-sharp minor
 No. 3 in G minor
 No. 4 in F major
 No. 5 in D minor
 No. 6 in E-flat minor
 No. 7 in A major
 No. 8 in C minor
 No. 9 in E minor
 Op. 104 No. 1 Nocturne No. 11 in F-sharp minor (1913)
 Op. 104 No. 2 Barcarolle No. 10 in A minor (1913)
 Op. 105 Barcarolle No. 11 in G minor(1913-5)
 Op. 106 Le jardin clos (1914), song cycle after van Lerberghe
Exaucement
Quand tu plonges tes yeux dans mes yeux
La messagère
Je me poserai sur ton coeur
Dans la nymphée
Dans la pénombre
Il m'est cher, amour, le bandeau
Inscription sur le sable
 Op. 106bis Barcarolle No. 12 in E-flat (1913-5)
 Op. 107 Nocturne No. 12 in E minor (1915)
 Op. 108 Violin Sonata No. 2 in E minor (1916-7)
 Op. 109 Cello Sonata No. 1 in D minor (1917)
 Op. 110 Une châtelaine en sa tour (1918) for harp, arr. Durand for piano
 Op. 111 Fantaisie for piano and orchestra (1918)
 Op. 112 Masques et bergamasques
 Op. 113 Mirages (1919), song cycle after de Brimont
Cygne sur l'eau
Reflets dans l'eau
Jardin nocturne
Danseuse
 Op. 114 C'est la paix! (1919)
 Op. 115 Piano Quintet No. 2 in C minor (1919–21)
 Op. 116 Barcarolle No. 13 in C (1921)
 Op. 117 Cello Sonata No. 2 in G minor (1921)
 Op. 118 L'horizon chimérique (1921), song cycle after de La Ville de Mirmont
La mer est infinie
Je me suis embarqué
Diane, Séléné
Vaisseaux, nous vous aurons aimés
 Op. 119 Nocturne No. 13 in B minor (1921)
 Op. 120 Piano Trio in D minor (1922-3)
 Op. 121 String Quartet in E minor (1923-4)

Notes 

 
Lists of compositions by composer
Lists of piano compositions by composer
Piano compositions in the 20th century